Pauline may refer to:

Religion
An adjective referring to St Paul the Apostle or a follower of his doctrines
An adjective referring to St Paul of Thebes, also called St Paul the First Hermit
An adjective referring to the Paulines, various religious orders associated with these two saints, or a member of such an order
Cappella Paolina, or Pauline Chapel, a chapel in the Vatican
Pauline Christianity, the Christianity associated with the beliefs and doctrines espoused by St Paul the Apostle
Pauline epistles, the thirteen or fourteen letters in the New Testament traditionally believed to have been written by St Paul the Apostle
Pauline privilege, a form of dissolution of marriage

People
Pauline (given name), a female given name
Pauline (singer) (born 1988), French singer (full name Pauline Vasseur)
Pauline Kamusewu (born 1982), Swedish singer of Zimbabwean origin, also known as just Pauline

Places
Pauline, Idaho, United States
Pauline, Kansas, United States
Pauline, South Carolina, United States
Pauline, Texas, United States

Other uses
Hurricane Pauline, which devastated much of Mexico in 1997
Pauline (Nintendo), fictional character in the Mario series of video games
Pauline (opera) (1876), by Frederic Cowen
Pauline (chamber opera) (2014), by Tobin Stokes
, an 1839 novel by George Sand
, a United States Navy patrol boat in commission from 1917 to 1919
An adjective referring to St Paul's School, London or a pupil or former pupil of the school
Pauline (crustacean), a fossil genus of ostracods from the Silurian
Pauline avibella, a fossil species
Pauline Laws, the house laws of the Romanov rulers of Russia

See also
Pauleen (disambiguation)
Paulina (disambiguation)
Paulin (disambiguation)
Paulinella, a genus of amoeboids